Tuiwa is a village located in  Town, Nagarzê County, Shannan, Tibet, China, located at the northeast shore of Lake Puma Yumco. Tuiwa is the second highest permanent settlement by elevation in the world, after La Rinconada, Peru. 

The village is located at an elevation of 5,070 meters above sea level. It is often referred to as "the highest administrative village in the world".

Tuiwa is located in a pastoral region. Animal husbandry is the main source of income for the villagers.

See also
List of towns and villages in Tibet
List of highest cities in the world

References

Populated places in Shannan, Tibet
Nagarzê County